p-Xylene (para-xylene) is an aromatic hydrocarbon. It is one of the three isomers of dimethylbenzene known collectively as xylenes. The p- stands for para-, indicating that the two methyl groups in p-xylene occupy the diametrically opposite substituent positions 1 and 4. It is in the positions of the two methyl groups, their arene substitution pattern, that it differs from the other isomers, o-xylene and m-xylene. All have the same chemical formula C6H4(CH3)2. All xylene isomers are colorless and highly flammable. The odor threshold of p-xylene is 0.62 parts per million (ppm).

Production
The production of p-xylene is industrially significant, with annual demand estimated at 37 million tons in 2014, and still on the increase. p-Xylene is produced by catalytic reforming of petroleum naphtha as part of the BTX aromatics (benzene, toluene and the xylene isomers) extracted from the catalytic reformate. The p-xylene is then separated out in a series of distillation, adsorption or crystallization and reaction processes from the m-xylene, o-xylene, and ethylbenzene. Its melting point is the highest among this series of isomers, but simple crystallization does not allow easy purification due to the formation of eutectic mixtures.

Such separation procedures are major cost factors in the production of p-xylene, and the search for alternative methods continues. For example, a reverse-osmosis technique has been proposed to improve various aspects of the processes.

Industrial applications
p-Xylene is an important chemical feedstock. Among other industrial applications, it is a raw material in the large scale synthesis of various polymers. In particular it is a component in the production of terephthalic acid for polyesters such as polyethylene terephthalate (generally known as PET). It also may be polymerised directly to produce parylene.

Toxicity and exposure
Xylenes are not acutely toxic, for example the LD50 (rat, oral) is 4300 mg/kg. Effects vary with animal and xylene isomer.

Concerns with xylenes focus on narcotic effects. Overexposure of p-xylene in humans can cause headache, fatigue, dizziness, listlessness, confusion, irritability, gastrointestinal disturbances including nausea and loss of appetite, flushing of the face, and a feeling of increased body heat. p-Xylene vapor exposure over the recommended exposure limit of 100 parts per million (ppm) can cause irritation to eye, nose, and throat and possible chest tightening and an abnormal gait.

p-Xylene occurs naturally in petroleum and coal tar. It is emitted by most combustion sources, including automobile exhaust and tobacco smoke.

Inhalation
Inhaling p-xylene can cause dizziness, headache, drowsiness, and nausea. If exposure through inhalation occurs, first aid includes fresh air, rest and possible medical attention. Through the use of ventilation or breathing protection, exposure to p-xylene through inhalation can be prevented.

Skin
Exposure of p-xylene through the skin can cause dry skin and redness. If skin exposure occurs, first aid includes rinsing and then washing the affected area with soap and water as well as removing any contaminated clothing and thoroughly cleaning and drying before reuse. Exposure can be prevented through the use of protective gloves.

Eyes
Exposure of p-xylene to eyes can cause redness and pain. If eyes are exposed, first aid includes rinsing of the eyes with water for several minutes, removal of contact lenses if applicable, and medical attention. Eye exposure can be prevented through the use of safety glasses or safety goggles.

Ingestion
Ingestion of p-xylene can result in a burning sensation, abdominal pain, dizziness, drowsiness, headache, and nausea. If p-xylene is ingested one's mouth should be rinsed and vomiting should not be induced. Further medical attention should be sought. Ingestion can be prevented by not eating, drinking, or smoking when working with p-xylene.

Short-term exposure
p-Xylene can cause issues with the central nervous system and if swallowed could cause chemical pneumonitis when breathed into the lungs.

Long-term exposure
Liquid p-xylene exposure to the skin over long periods of time can remove the fat from the skin. The substance may also have effects on the central nervous system. Exposure can enhance hearing loss caused by noise exposure. Animal tests suggest that this substance could cause damage to human development and reproductive systems.

References

External links
 MSDS

Alkylbenzenes
C2-Benzenes
IARC Group 3 carcinogens